The Barahona rock frog (Eleutherodactylus alcoae), or Hispaniola dwarf robber frog, is a species of frogs in the family Eleutherodactylidae that is endemic to southern Hispaniola.

Distribution and habitat
It is found on the Barahona Peninsula of the Dominican Republic and immediately adjacent coastal area in Haiti. Its natural habitat is dry scrub forest; by day it retreats into caves and rock crevices.

Conservation
This frog is common in suitable habitat, but it is only known from three locations threatened by habitat loss. It occurs with the Jaragua National Park and Sierra de Bahoruco National Park, but significant habitat destruction occurs within these parks.

References

alcoae
Endemic fauna of Hispaniola
Amphibians of the Dominican Republic
Amphibians of Haiti
Taxa named by Albert Schwartz (zoologist)
Amphibians described in 1971
Taxonomy articles created by Polbot